Lacanja Chansayab is a village in the Mexican state of Chiapas. It is a tourist attraction that is close to Lacanja ruins and the waterfall at the Río Gordo.

See also
 Lacandon Jungle

References 
Liza Prado, Gary Chandler. Moon Chiapas. Avalon Travel, Oct 1. pg. 66-67

Populated places in Chiapas